Jarvis Pernell Green (born January 12, 1979) is a former American football defensive end who played in the National Football League (NFL). He was drafted by the New England Patriots in the fourth round of the 2002 NFL draft. He played college football at LSU. Greens’ most memorable play is the same one that haunts him. It was also arguably the greatest play in Super Bowl history. It was 3rd and 7 at the end of the 4th quarter in Super Bowl XLII when Eli Manning escaped Jarvis Greens’ game saving sack. Green had Eli in his clutches, but Eli escaped and threw the ball to David Tyree, who leaped and pinned the ball to his helmet, while making the 32 yard catch that set up the game winning touchdown.

Early years
Green grew up in Donaldsonville, Louisiana, and attended Donaldsonville High School, where he was a Class 3A defensive MVP.

College career
Green played college football at Louisiana State University, where he ranks fourth on the school’s all-time sack list with 20 sacks for 123 yards. In 1998, Green set an LSU freshman record with eight sacks for 46 yards, starting 10 games at defensive end. As a sophomore in 1999, Green had seven sacks and 51 tackles. In 2000, Green had 31 tackles and one sack in eight games started. In his senior season in 2001, Green was voted a second-team All-SEC selection after picking up 52 tackles and leading the team with four sacks.

Professional career

New England Patriots

Green was drafted in the fourth round (126th overall) by the New England Patriots in the 2002 NFL Draft. In his rookie campaign in 2002, Green recorded 2.5 sacks and started four games. In 2003, Green started seven games and had two sacks; in the AFC Championship against the Indianapolis Colts, Green set career highs with 2.5 sacks and six tackles. Green played in all 16 games in 2004 for the Patriots, starting all three playoff games, including Super Bowl XXXIX. He finished the season with a four sacks. In August 2005, Green was signed to a five-year contract extension by the Patriots; he would go on to post 2.5 sacks while starting five games during the 2005 season.

Green would continue to see limited starting time in 2006, filling in for an injured Richard Seymour. Green set a career-high in 2006 with 7.5 sacks and two passes defensed. With Seymour injured again in 2007, Green would start 10 games and pick up 6.5 sacks, plus a career-high 39 tackles. Green himself missed time in 2008 with an ankle injury, but still managed to play in 14 games and record two sacks.

In 2009, Green was active for 13 games for the Patriots, starting 12 and missing three games in November after knee surgery. He finished the season with 36 tackles and one sack.

Denver Broncos
Green signed a 4-year, $20 million deal  with the Denver Broncos on March 9, 2010. He was released by the team on September 4, 2010.

Houston Texans
Green signed with the Texans on December 15, after defensive end Mario Williams was placed on injured reserve.

Business Career During Football Career
While still active in the NFL Jarvis opened The Capital Restaurant in his hometown in 2008 and it closed in 2010. 
About the restaurant Jarvis said, “At the end of the day I lost a lot of money but that’s part of investment, part of taking risks and I have to move on.”

Life after football
Following his retirement from professional football after the 2010-11 NFL season, Green became involved in several food-related business ventures. He opened a shrimp wholesale company named Oceans97, named for his uniform number with the Patriots. He is currently the ambassador for Chef 2 You, a smartphone application designed to offer chef-prepared meals for home delivery.

Green told Scoop B Radio Podcast's Brandon Scoop B Robinson that he had opportunities to go into coaching and broadcasting, but cited owing a friend a favor as his reasoning for going into the shrimping business.

References

External links
New England Patriots bio
Personal website
Ocean 97 official website

1979 births
Living people
Sportspeople from Thibodaux, Louisiana
Players of American football from Louisiana
American football defensive ends
African-American players of American football
LSU Tigers football players
New England Patriots players
Denver Broncos players
Houston Texans players
People from Donaldsonville, Louisiana
21st-century African-American sportspeople
20th-century African-American sportspeople